Clement Courtenay Ligoure (13 October 1887 – 23 May 1922) was a Trinidadian doctor and newspaper publisher who was the first Black physician to practise in Nova Scotia, Canada. He is also noted for treating hundreds of victims of the Halifax Explosion from his home clinic as well as being an editor and publisher of  The Atlantic Advocate newspaper.

Early life and education 
Born in San Fernando, Trinidad and Tobago, he was the son of Clement François and Amanda M. (née) Crooke. His father worked for the Supreme Court of Trinidad and Tobago.

In  April 1904, Ligoure moved to the United States; he was 19.

In 1906, he started studies at Queen's University in Ontario, Canada. At the university, he earned a Bachelor of Medicine Degree in 1914 and a Doctor of Medicine degree in 1916.

Career

Military and early medical work 
With World War I underway, Ligoure enlisted in the Canadian military and ended up travelling to Halifax, Nova Scotia—arriving in 1916, two months after getting his final degree—to be a medical officer in the No. 2 Construction Battalion. It was an all-Black battalion he co-founded. However, an "error" in the application resulted in him being replaced by a white physician, "likely due to the British War Office ergo the Canadian Department of Militias and Defence refusing to see past the colour bar." He still assisted by raising money and spent seven months recruiting for the battalion.

Despite being a licensed physician, Ligoure was not allowed to use hospitals in Halifax. Still, he served as medical officer for Canadian National Railway workers. His fifteen-person clinic was located in his house and named the Amanda Private Hospital for his mother.

Halifax Explosion 
After the Halifax Explosion on 6 December 1917, Ligoure worked long hours to treat blast victims. Some of the patients that filled his clinic had been unable to get medical help elsewhere. In a statement to Dr. Archibald MacMechan, Ligoure conveyed that he worked day and night:In spite of the warning of a second explosion, he worked steadily till 8 p.m. [...] Seven people spent the night in his office, laid upon blankets. On December 7th, 8th and 9th, he worked steadily both night and day, doing outside work at night.
At first his only support was from his housekeeper and his boarder. On 10 December, Ligoure requested assistance from City Hall and received two nurses to come with him to establish an "official dressing station" for changing and applying bandages. Eventually, he was leading ten nurses, six other women and four soldiers (one of which was a physician).

His work continued to 28 December, with records indicating nearly 200 patients were helped each day. His patients were almost all white. According to archival records, patients were not charged. This work has led him to be recognized as a "local hero" and "unsung hero".

The Atlantic Advocate newspaper 
Ligoure served as the editor and publisher of the The Atlantic Advocate. Publication took place in the home he had purchased in 1917 at 166 North Street. It was the first newspaper in Nova Scotia owned and published by Black Canadians. The newspaper ran from 1915 to 1917 and its masthead read: "Devoted to the interests of colored people."

Death and legacy 
During a visit with his brother Clarence in Tobago, Ligoure contracted malignant malaria. He was transported to the Colonial Hospital in Port of Spain, Trinidad, where he died on 23 May 1922.

David Woods' play Extraordinary Acts, in part, dramatized Ligoure's role in the Halifax Explosion. It was scheduled to be staged in 2020, but was delayed due to the COVID-19 pandemic.

An inaugural "Dr. Clement Ligoure Award" was given in 2021 by the Doctors Nova Scotia organization to Nova Scotia's Chief Medical Officer of Health. It is a non-annual prize given to a physican for handling a medical crisis in Nova Scotia.

In Halifax, the former house of Ligoure (of which only a part still stands) was given heritage status on 24 January 2023. The decision by Halifax's regional council followed lobbying efforts by notable Black community members. The house is listed at 5812-14 North Street, and was built in 1892.

References

External links 
 Personal account of the aftermath of Halifax Explostion by Clement Ligoure from Nova Scotia Archives
 Heritage Designation Application for 5812-14/ 166 North St, Halifax from Friends of the Halifax Common
 Digitized issues and overview of The Atlantic Advocate from Nova Scotia Archives 

1886 births
1922 deaths
Queen's University at Kingston alumni
Canadian newspaper editors
Canadian newspaper publishers (people)
Trinidad and Tobago physicians
20th-century Canadian physicians
Trinidad and Tobago emigrants to Canada
People from San Fernando, Trinidad and Tobago
People from Halifax, Nova Scotia
Canadian general practitioners
Physicians from Nova Scotia
Black Nova Scotians